An All-American team is an honorary sports team composed of the best amateur players of a specific season for each team position—who in turn are given the honorific "All-America" and typically referred to as "All-American athletes", or simply "All-Americans".  Although the honorees generally do not compete together as a unit, the term is used in U.S. team sports to refer to players who are selected by members of the national media.  Walter Camp selected the first All-America team in the early days of American football in 1889.  The 1986 NCAA Men's Basketball All-Americans are honorary lists that include All-American selections from the Associated Press (AP), the United States Basketball Writers Association (USBWA), the National Association of Basketball Coaches (NABC), and United Press International (UPI) for the 1985–86 NCAA Division I men's basketball season.  All selectors chose at least a first and second 5-man team. The AP and UPI chose third teams, while NABC selected a fourth team as well; AP also lists honorable mention selections.

The Consensus 1986 College Basketball All-American team is determined by aggregating the results of the four major All-American teams.  To earn "consensus" status, a player must win honors from a majority of the different All-American teams.

1986 Consensus All-America team

Individual All-America teams

AP Honorable Mention:

Rafael Addison, Syracuse
Mark Alarie, Duke
Wendell Alexis, Syracuse
Cadillac Anderson, Houston
Terrance Bailey, Wagner
Freddie Banks, UNLV
Ken Barlow, Notre Dame
Jerome Batiste, McNeese State
Kenny Battle, Northern Illinois
Dale Blaney, West Virginia
Muggsy Bogues, Wake Forest
Johnny Brown, New Mexico
John Brownlee, Texas
Jeff Chatman, BYU
Derrick Chievous, Missouri
Dave Colbert, Dayton
Norris Coleman, Kansas State
Fennis Dembo, Wyoming
Bruce Douglas, Illinois
Greg Dreiling, Kansas
Dave Feitl, UTEP,
Paul Fortier, Washington
Alvin Franklin, Houston
Kenny Gattison, Old Dominion
Tony George, Fairfield
Gary Grant, Michigan
Greg Grant, Utah State
Jeff Grayer, Iowa State
Steve Hale, North Carolina
Hersey Hawkins, Bradley
David Henderson, Duke
Carven Holcombe, TCU
Dave Hoppen, Nebraska
Jeff Hornacek, Iowa State
Kevin Houston, Army
Mark Jackson, St. John's
Michael Jackson, Georgetown
Buck Johnson, Alabama
Darryl Johnson, Michigan State
Kevin Johnson, California
Anthony Jones, UNLV
Nicky Jones, VCU
Earl Kelley, Connecticut
Ron Kellogg, Kansas
Darryl Kennedy, Oklahoma
Steve Kerr, Arizona
Larry Krystkowiak, Montana
Byron Larkin, Xavier
Kevin Lewis, SMU
Reggie Lewis, Northeastern
Troy Lewis, Purdue
Carl Lott, TCU
Don Marbury, Texas A&M
Dan Majerle, Central Michigan
Maurice Martin, St. Joseph's
Jim McCaffrey, Holy Cross
Tim McCalister, Oklahoma
Andre McCloud, Seton Hall
Roger McCready, Boston College
Forrest McKenzie, Loyola Marymount
Reggie Miller, UCLA
Jerome Mincy, UAB
Steve Mitchell, UAB
Todd Mitchell, Purdue
Keith Morrison, Washington State
Ken Norman, Illinois
José Ortiz, Oregon State
Dan Palombizio, Ball State
Chuck Person, Auburn
Dwayne Polee, Pepperdine
Olden Polynice, Virginia
Harold Pressley, Villanova
Dwayne Randall, Nevada
David Rivers, Notre Dame
John Salley, Georgia Tech
Brad Sellers, Ohio State
Charles Smith, Pittsburgh
Juden Smith, UTEP
Keith Smith, Loyola Marymount
Kenny Smith, North Carolina
Otis Smith, Jacksonville
Rich Strong, Colorado State
Jerry Stroman, Utah
Rick Suder, Duquesne
Robert Tatum, Ohio
Billy Thompson, Louisville
Andre Turner, Memphis State
Milt Wagner, Louisville
Chris Washburn, NC State
Anthony Watson, San Diego State
Chris Welp, Washington
Tony White, Tennessee
John Williams, LSU
Reggie Williams, Georgetown
David Wingate, Georgetown

References

NCAA Men's Basketball All-Americans
All-Americans